Empress Xin or Princess Xin (personal name unknown) was a consort of Zhang Zuo (Prince Wei) of the Chinese Former Liang dynasty.

Whether her title was empress or princess is unclear, because historical sources differ on the subject. The Book of Jin, which reported that her husband claimed the title of emperor when he declared a total break from Eastern Jin dynasty in 354, reported that he created her empress. Zizhi Tongjian, which reported that her husband claimed the title of prince, reported that he created her princess.  Nothing else is known about her. In 355, when her husband was killed in a coup and replaced by his nephew Zhang Xuanjing, his two sons (whether by her or not) were also executed, but nothing was mentioned about her fate.

References 

 Historical sources appear to imply that the last ruler of the state, Zhang Tianxi, had a princess (who might have been the mother of his first heir apparent Zhang Dahuai (張大懷)), but no name was given for her, nor was her existence conclusively stated.

|-

Former Liang princesses
Sixteen Kingdoms empresses